4-Desoxymescaline, or 4-methyl-3,5-dimethoxyphenethylamine, is a mescaline analogue related to other psychedelic phenethylamines. It is commonly referred to as DESOXY. DESOXY was discovered by Alexander Shulgin and published in his book PiHKAL.

Effects 
The effects of DESOXY vary significantly from mescaline, despite their chemical similarity.

Dosage 
A typical dosage is within the range of 40–120 mg and lasts 6–8 hours.

Legality 
In 1970 the Controlled Substances Act placed mescaline into Schedule I in the United States. It is similarly controlled in other nations. Depending on whether or not it is intended for human consumption, 4-desoxymescaline could be considered an analogue of mescaline, under the Federal Analogue Act and similar bills in other countries, making it illegal to manufacture, buy, possess, or distribute without a DEA or related license.

DESOXY is also an isomer of 2C-D which makes it a schedule 1 drug in the United States.

References

External links 
 Alexander Shulgin, Jacob, P. Structure-Activity Relationships of the Classic Hallucinogens and Their Analogs. NIDA Research Monograph 146 (Hallucinogens: An Update), 1994.

Psychedelic phenethylamines
Mescalines